Paddy's Show and Telly is a British one-off game show that aired two editions on ITV on 29 December 2011 and 22 December 2012, hosted by Paddy McGuinness.

Format
The format of the show involves three rounds, and three different teams. The first round features a board which contains six different categories. Each team must pick one of the categories, and thus, must answer one major question on the subject. They are then asked three sub-related questions, and overall, can earn up to a total of forty points.

The second round involves a telly carousel, which contains twelve different video clips from programmes. Paddy begins by starting the carousel, and when it stops, each team are asked to watch the clip and answer four questions on it. Thus, another forty points are on offer. The team with the fewest points at the end of round two are eliminated.

The final round involves Paddy's planner, where the two remaining teams go head-to-head by answering a series of questions based on programmes featured in an interactive Sky television planner. The team who answer the most questions correctly in the final round are awarded £20,000.

Episodes

1Team won the jackpot of £20,000 for Sparks and Alzheimer's Society
2Team won the jackpot of £20,000 for The Terrence Higgins Trust and British Heart Foundation

External links

2011 British television series debuts
2012 British television series endings
2010s British game shows
ITV (TV network) original programming
Television series by ITV Studios